Steel Force is a steel roller coaster located at Dorney Park & Wildwater Kingdom in Allentown, Pennsylvania. As of 2022, Steel Force is tied with Mamba at Worlds of Fun as the eighth longest steel coaster in the world.

History
On September 16, 1996, Dorney Park announced that Steel Force would be coming to the park. The ride opened on May 30, 1997.

Steel Force has been ranked among the top 10 steel coasters in the world. Its logo was originally intended for the stand-up coaster Mantis (now Rougarou), which opened at Cedar Point a year earlier. Mantis was originally going to be named "Banshee," but the name and logo were changed prior to its debut. Dorney Park adopted it for its Steel Force coaster a year later.

Ride experience 
The train departs the station entering a slight decline into the lift hill. At the bottom of the first drop, riders pass through a tunnel and into a camelback hill. The train then ascends a third hill, which doubles as the entrance to the downward, helix turnaround. After the helix, the train enters a mid-course brake run, before entering the ride's finale – a series of three back-to-back airtime hills and a double up. The first airtime hill in this series features a tunnel, and an on-ride camera snaps photos at the bottom of the second. Following the double up element, the train passes over the entrance plaza and enters the final brake run before returning to the station.

Awards

Construction data 

The following materials are included:

2,000 tons of steel
 of concrete footers
2,742 anchor bolts

Ride elements 
Two  tunnels
510-degree downward helix
Mid-course brake run
4 airtime hills, including a double-up hill
On-ride photo camera (between the last two airtime hills)

Gallery

References

External links

Official Steel Force page

Steel roller coasters
Roller coasters introduced in 1997
Roller coasters operated by Cedar Fair
Roller coasters in Pennsylvania